The geology of Pakistan encompasses the varied landscapes that make up the land constituting modern-day Pakistan, which are a blend of its geological history, and its climate over the past few million years.

The Geological Survey of Pakistan is the premier agency responsible for studying the country's geology.

Tectonic zone

Pakistan geologically overlaps both with the Indian and the Eurasian tectonic plates where its Sindh and Punjab provinces lie on the north-western corner of the Indian plate while Balochistan and most of the Khyber-Pakhtunkhwa lie within the Eurasian plate which mainly comprises the Iranian plateau, some parts of the Middle East and Central Asia.  The northern areas and Azad Kashmir lie mainly in Central Asia along the edge of the Indian plate and hence are prone to violent earthquakes where the two tectonic plates collide.

Earthquakes

Since it lies in the centre of tectonic plates, Pakistan has been vulnerable to a number of deadly earthquakes.

Mining

Mining is an important industry in Pakistan. Pakistan has deposits of several mineral products including coal, copper, gold, chromite, mineral salt, bauxite and several other minerals. There are also a variety of precious and semi-precious minerals that are mined. These include peridot, aquamarine, topaz, ruby, emerald, rare-earth minerals bastnaesite and xenotime, sphene, tourmaline, and many varieties of quartz.

The Pakistan Mineral Development Corporation is the responsible authority for the support and development of the mining industry. Gemstones Corporation of Pakistan looks after the interests of stake holders in gemstone mining and polishing as an official entity. Baluchistan province is the richest in mineral resources available in Pakistan. While recently coal deposits have been discovered in Thar, Sindh. Khyber Pakhtunkhwa is rich in gemstones. Most of the mineral gems found in Pakistan exist here. Apart from oil, gas and some mineral used in nuclear energy purposes which comes directly under federal control mining of other minerals is provincial issue. Currently around 52 minerals, are mined and processed in Pakistan.

See also
List of minerals of Pakistan

References

External links
Stratigraphy of Pakistan